Llorca is a surname. Notable people with the surname include:

José Pedro Pérez-Llorca (born 1940), Spanish politician
Ricardo Llorca (born 1962), Spanish composer
Rubén Torres Llorca (born 1957), Cuban-American artist
Samuel Llorca Ripoll (born 1985), Spanish footballer
Álex Llorca Castillo (born 1989), Spanish basketball player

See also
 Lorca (disambiguation)